The Palau swiftlet (Aerodramus pelewensis) is a species of swift in the family Apodidae.
It is endemic to Palau.

Its natural habitat is subtropical or tropical moist lowland forests.

References

Sources
 BirdLife International 2004.  Aerodramus pelewensis.   2006 IUCN Red List of Threatened Species.   Downloaded on 24 July 2007.

Aerodramus
Birds of Palau
Endemic fauna of Palau
Endemic birds of Palau
Birds described in 1935
Taxonomy articles created by Polbot